Novoye Domozerovo is a rural locality (a village) and the administrative center of Yugskoye Rural Settlement, Cherepovetsky District, Vologda Oblast, Russia. The population was 564 as of 2002. There are 8 streets.

Geography 
Burtsevo is the nearest rural locality.

References 

Rural localities in Cherepovetsky District